The women's 100 metres at the 2013 World Championships in Athletics was held at the Luzhniki Stadium on 11–12 August and was won by Shelly-Ann Fraser-Pryce.

In the first round, English Gardner won her third heat decisively in a time of 10.94 seconds.  Others qualified for the semifinal round in up to 11.41 seconds.  The semis were faster, since although the first was slowest at 11.08, the other two were won in under 11 seconds, with the fastest time qualifier Alexandria Anderson at 11.01.

In the final, there was no doubt who would win as Shelly-Ann Fraser-Pryce shot out of the block leaving nothing but a pink streak (hair and shoes) for her competitors to follow. Jeter's 10.94 was the same as Gardner's time in the heats.  But Gardner only had 10.97 left for the final to miss a medal.  Slow reacting Kerron Stewart gave up .06 at the start line but lost the silver medal by only .04.

Records
Prior to the competition, the records were as follows:

Qualification standards

Schedule

Results

Heats
Qualification: First 3 in each heat (Q) and the next 6 fastest (q) advanced to the semifinals.

Wind:Heat 1: −0.3 m/s, Heat 2: −0.4 m/s, Heat 3: −0.5 m/s, Heat 4: −0.3 m/s, Heat 5: −0.6 m/s, Heat 6: −0.6 m/s

Semifinals
Qualification: First 2 in each heat (Q) and the next 2 fastest (q) advanced to the final.

Wind: Heat 1: −0.4 m/s, Heat 2: −0.4 m/s, Heat 3: −0.1 m/s

Final
Wind: −0.3 m/s.

References

External links
100 metres results at IAAF website

100 metres
100 metres at the World Athletics Championships
2013 in women's athletics